Egbert is a masculine given name and a surname. It may also refer to:

 Egbert, Ontario, Canada, a town
 Egbert, Missouri, United States, an unincorporated community
 Mount Egbert, Alexander Island, Antarctica
 Fort Egbert, Eagle, Alaska, a US Army base

See also
The Egbert Gospels, commissioned by Archbishop Egbert of Trier
Speedy Eggbert, a 1998 computer game